Konkani is a southern Indo-Aryan language belonging to the Indo-European family of languages spoken in the Konkan coastal region of India. It has approximately 3.6 million speakers.

Konkani is the official language of the Indian state of Goa and a minority language in the Konkan Division of Maharashtra state, and the Malabar Coast of Karnataka and Kerala states, where Konkani speakers emigrated during the Bahmani, Maratha, and Portuguese conquests. It is also one of the official languages of India.

This article is restricted to Konkani dialects spoken in the states of Goa, Karnataka, and Kerala, where the largest number of Konkani speakers are found.

Structure

Introduction

Dialects

The Goan standard dialect of Konkani, the Antruz dialect, is based on Goan Hindu Konkani which was originally the speech of the Hindus from the Novas Conquistas, but it is now spoken by Hindus all over Goa with minor variations. It is also spoken by the Christians of the New Conquests who form a small percentage of the Goan Christians. The vast majority of Goan Christians live in areas called the  Velhas Conquistas. Their speech varies considerably from the speech of the Goan Hindus. They also speak two considerably different dialects: Bardes Christian dialect, spoken in Bardes and Tiswadi which form the northern part of the Old Conquests and Saxtti Christian dialect, spoken in Sashti and Mormugao which form the southern part of the Old Conquests. However, these two dialects have certain common features which can be referred to as Goan Christian Konkani features. The major Konkani dialects of Karnataka are the Karnataka Saraswat dialect, spoken by the Saraswat Brahmins of the coastal districts of Karnataka, and Karnataka Christian dialect, spoken by Christians in the coastal districts of Karnataka. The Saraswats and Christians of Karnataka also speak considerably different dialects since they came to Karnataka from different parts of Goa and at different times. The Saraswats came from southern Old Conquests (Sashti and Mormugao) in the sixteenth century because of Portuguese religious persecution. The Christians came in the seventeenth and eighteenth centuries mainly from Bardes and Tiswadi.

Writings and Scripts

A good number of writings are available in four of the dialects mentioned above: Goa Hindu, Bardes Christian, Canara Christian and Canara Saraswat. The Canara Saraswat dialect includes the speech of the Gaud Saraswats as well as that of the Chitrapur Saraswats as the differences between these two varieties of speech are minor. Sashti Christians generally use the Bardes dialect for writing. The Goan Hindus use the Devanagari script in their writings but the Goan Christians use the Roman script. The Saraswats of Karnataka use the Devanagari script in the North Canara district but the Kannada script in Udupi and South Canara . The Canara Christians use the Kannada script. The Devanagari script has been promulgated as the official script for Konkani in Goa.

The Standard Dialect

Among the various Konkani dialects, the Konkani standard dialect, which is based on the Antruz Hindu dialect, has clearly emerged as the dominant dialect. It has several points in its favour. It is spoken by the majority of the Konkani speakers in Goa with minor variations. It has the best literature if not the most abundant. It has already established itself as the school dialect in Goa. The textbooks all the way up to the university level are in this dialect. It is used in the government offices of Goa where Konkani has been adopted as the official language of the state. It does not show as much regional diversity as the Goan Christian speech. It also occupies a middle position among the Konkani dialects of Goa and Karnataka without too many archaisms, innovations, or non-Sanskrit loans that might hamper cross-dialectal communication. The information in this article is based on the Goan standard dialect unless specified otherwise. The standard dialect will hereafter be referred to as Standard Konkani in this article.

Phoneme Inventory

Konkani Phonemes (Standard Konkani)

The phonemes of Konkani are given below:

Vowels

The vowels are called svara (svara-sound).

The long (vhoḍ) vowels are about twice as long as the short (sān) vowels. The diphthongs are usually pronounced about one and a half times as long as the short vowels, though most grammatical texts place them with the long vowels.

The number of vowels in Konkani is a subject of debate. Sources argue for anywhere from 8 distinct vowels to 16 distinct vowels, not including an equal number of long vowels and nasal vowels. The following table shows one interpretation of the vowels found in the Konkani language, while the IPA Chart below the table shows another interpretation.

Further complicating a consensus of the inventory of Konkani vowels is the varied use of vocabulary and phonemic change as a result of different dialects based on geographic or religious affiliation. Further research needs to be performed for satisfactory treatment of the subject, and the several dictionaries in existence must be concatenated to reach a standardization.

Consonants

Vowel Rounding in Christian Dialects

In the Christian dialects (Bardes Christian and Saxtti Christian), there are fewer vowel phonemes as the vowel  a has merged with o.
See table below:

Phonetic details and Phoneme Distribution

General

The alveolar and palatal stops are affricates. However, the phoneme  is phonetically  except word-initially, in gemination, and after a nasal. The consonants in the palatal column are alveopalatal except for the glides which are truly palatal. The sibilants becomes retroflex before a retroflex consonant. The retroflex voiced stops are pronounced as flaps except word-initially, in gemination, and after homorganic nasals. The voiced/voiceless contrast is found only in the stops and affricates. The retroflex lateral  does not occur word-initially.

In the Canara Saraswat dialect, all initial-syllable vowels in disyllabic words have longer variants before single consonants, e.g. tīni (three), sūna (daughter-in-law), yēku (one - masc.), mōru (peacock), pāna (leaf), etc. In all dialects, vowels have longer variants in monosyllables.

The Aspirate/ Non-aspirate Contrast

The aspirate/non-aspirate contrast is found in all stops and affricates except for the voiceless labial stop as the old voiceless aspirated stop has changed into the fricative (/f/) in Standard Konkani. Some dialects have /pʰ/ as well which freely alternates with /f/. The aspirate/non-aspirate contrast is also found in the glides and in the non-retroflex nasals and laterals. The initial-syllable vowel is shortened after the aspirates and also after the fricatives. Aspirates in a non-initial position are usually found only in careful speech in the Goan standard dialect - mostly, in Sanskrit loans. In most dialects, aspirates occur only in the initial position. Even in the initial position, unaspirated consonants are substituted for aspirates in several dialects but the contrast is still maintained by retaining the shorter vowel in the initial syllable.

Initial syllable vowel shortening after an aspirate

Palatalisation

The Palatalised/Non-palatalised Contrast

There is a palatalised/non-palatalised contrast in Konkani. The examples in the table below illustrate the formation of palatalised consonants. Palatalisation is indicated by [ ' ].

In the case of sonorants, the palatalised/non-palatalised contrast is found only among the unaspirated consonants. Among the glides, only the unaspirated labio-velar glide shows this contrast. The palatalised/non-palatalised contrast is found in all obstruents except for the alveolars and the palatals. Where a palatalised alveolar is expected according to the grammatical pattern, a palatal is found instead.

Replacement of an alveolar affricate or fricative by a palatal one

In Konkani dialects other than Sashti Christian, the palatalised consonants occur only before the vowels a, o, and occasionally before u. In the Sashti Christian dialect, however, they also occur in the word-final position, e.g. ʋɑːt' (candle), mɑːr' (hit) second person singular imperative. Palatalised consonants contrast with unpalatalised consonant + y clusters.

Palatalised consonants and unpalatalised consonant plus y clusters

In Devanagari and Kannada orthography, a palatalised consonant is often represented as if the consonant is followed by y, whereas a consonant + y cluster is represented as if the consonant letter is followed by iy. However, representing items like mat'ɑ͂ː,  potʰyɑ͂ː, tal̥yɑ͂ː, etc. as if they consist of three syllables is misleading. According to their phonological behaviour, these are disyllabic words and not trisyllabic. They do not show a shortening of the initial syllable vowel as polysyllabic words (words consisting of three or more syllables) do in the Goan dialects.

Palatalised aspirates occur mostly in Sanskrit loans and most of these are found only in the intervocalic position. So, dialects which have aspirate consonants only in the initial position cannot have palatalised aspirates except the few that occur initially.

Oral And Nasal Vowel Contrast

There is a contrast between oral and nasal vowels in Konkani. See the table below for examples:

Nasal vowels

Konkani is said to be a nasal language.  In Konkani, nasality can spread from a nasal consonant or vowel through regressive assimilation across sonorants and glides through more than one syllable. In many languages, a nasal vowel is followed by a short homorganic nasal consonant before the following consonant. In Konkani this can occur even across a word boundary. Thus, un̥ɛ͂ kɐr ‘decrease’ can sound like (un̥ɛ͂ ŋkɐr). Vowel nasalization has come about through progressive assimilation as well. A word final vowel becomes nasal when it is preceded by a nasal consonant. This neutralizes the contrast between an oral vowel and a nasal vowel in the word-final position after a nasal consonant. For example, ordinarily, a class 1 adjective in Konkani ends in an oral vowel in masculine plural and feminine singular and in a nasal vowel in neuter singular and neuter plural. However, in the case of un̥o ‘less’, the masculine plural and the neuter singular both end up the same at the surface and the feminine singular and the neuter plural and the  neuter plural forms also end up the same at the surface because of the spread of nasalisation from the nasal consonant to the word-final vowel.

Neutralization of contrast

Temporal Compensation

According to what the phoneticians call the principle of temporal compensation, units of speech such as words tend to undergo quantitative adjustment so as to approach equal duration in a given environment although they might vary in terms of number of syllables as well as number of segments. The relatively short units stretch and the relatively long units contract in this process. Konkani is a good candidate to exemplify this principle.

 Monosyllabic lengthening and polysyllabic shortening in Konkani
ūṭ  - get up

The morpheme uṭ  is perceptibly longer in the monosyllabic 2nd person. sng. imperative form and perceptibly shorter in the trisyllabic 3rd per. sing fut. form than in the disyllabic 2nd per. pl. imperative and 3rd per. sing present imperfect forms. There is evidence from comparative data that this is a reflection of actual sound changes. The cognates of Konkani monosyllabic words like uṭ  do not show any perceptible lengthening in related languages such as Hindi. The perceptible polysyllabic shortening characteristic of the Goan dialects of Konkani is absent even in the non-Goan dialects of Konkani.

The fact that such quantitative adjustment is not limited to the initial syllable can be seen from the examples in the table below:

 Temporal compensation as reflected in Konkani plural formation

Note the modification of the feminine -i nouns in the plural is 1. When the plural suffix -o is added, the stem-final -i remains a vowel in the case of the monosyllabic stems, but is reduced to a glide in the case of the disyllabic stems which have a single intervocalic consonant and to mere palatalization of the preceding consonant in the case of longer stems (i.e., disyllabic stems which have more than one consonant in the medial position and stems containing more than two syllables). The stem-final -u͂ behaves similarly in the neuter nouns in 2. When the plural suffix -a͂ is added, it remains a vowel in the case of the monosyllabic stems and is reduced to a glide in the case of the disyllabic stems which have a single intervocalic consonant. However, it is reduced to zero in the case of longer stems.

Glides before word-initial vowels

Word-initially, front vowels are preceded by the palatal glide and back rounded vowels are preceded by the labio-velar glide in the Konkani dialects of Karnataka. This is a phonological characteristic of the South Dravidian languages which earlier prevailed also in Goa since Goa was ruled by Kannada dynasties for several centuries before the advent of the Portuguese. The Konkani dictionaries prepared by the Portuguese missionaries in the seventeenth century reflect the presence of such glides in Old Konkani.

Phonological rules and alternations

The major phonological rules along with the alternations are based on or described in the following paragraphs:

Vowel height assimilation

Lower mid vowels are replaced by higher mid vowels when a high vowel or higher mid vowel occurs in the next syllable; e.g. ‘fall’ (intransitive verb stem) paḍa-, 3rd per. sing. subjective paḍśī (< paḍaśī), 3rd per. sing. present imperfect  paṭṭā  (< paḍṭā  < paḍtā); ‘break’ (intransitive verb stem) moḍa-, infinitive mōḍunk, (intransitive verb stem) moṭṭā (moḍṭā  < moḍtā). This rule must apply prior to the vowel syncope rule with which it has a counter bleeding relationship.

Vowel rounding

In the Canara Saraswat dialect, the vowel a is replaced by ō  when the vowel u occurs in the following syllable, e.g. ‘do’ 2nd per sing imperative  kari, first person singular optative kōrũ, infinitive kōrcāka (< kōruñcāka  < karuścāka). In the Karnataka Christian dialect, the mid vowel a is replaced by o when a rounded vowel occurs in the following syllable, e.g. ‘do’ 2nd per sing imperative kar, first person singular optative kōrũ͂, infinitive karacāk  (< karuñcāk).; ‘bud’ direct pl. kaḷe, direct singular kaḷo. In the Canara  Saraswat dialect, the vowel rounding rule must apply prior to the vowel syncope rule, but in the Canara Christian dialect, it applies after the syncope rule.

Vowel syncope

A vowel is deleted in a medial syllable (i.e., in the environment vowel consonant_consonant vowel) provided that there is no cluster of non-homorganic consonants next to it,

If a vowel at a morpheme boundary and another vowel in the same word both meet the conditions for syncope, it is the vowel at the morpheme boundary that undergoes syncope.

Reduction of high vowels before another vowel

Under temporal compensation (see 1.3.5), it has been seen that the high vowels i/ī  and u/ū are reduced to glides y and v respectively before another vowel when they occur in the second syllable after a single consonant. It has also been seen that they are further reduced to palatalisation (of the preceding consonant) and au respectively when they occur before another vowel in the second syllable after a consonant cluster or in a later syllable.

Final Vowel Elision

In the Canara Saraswat dialect, any word taken in isolation ends in a vowel, but in connected speech all word-final vowels are elided in words containing more than one syllable when another word follows without a pause, e.g. hā̃va tākkā āppaytā̃ (hā̃va ‘I’, tākkā ‘him’, āppaytā̃ ‘call’) is pronounced as hā̃v tāk āppaytā̃. Such vowel elision in connected speech is found in the Sashti Christian dialect as well. In both dialects, if the elided vowel is a front vowel, the preceding consonant is palatalised.

Final vowel addition

In the Karnataka  dialects, a short predictable vowel [ i ] (high back rounded vowel) may optionally be added to words ending in a consonant. If the preceding consonant is y, this predictable vowel becomes i. If the preceding consonant is a labial, or if the vowel in the preceding syllable is rounded, the predictable vowel becomes u.

Final vowel addition

It has been pointed out earlier that vowels in monosyllabic words are lengthened. These long vowels remain long even when a short vowel is added to the monosyllabic words as shown here.

A word ending in a geminate stop must compulsorily add the predictable vowel at the end. Words do not normally end in a geminate stop except in some adjectives ending in a consonant. The final consonant can be geminated in order to convey an intensive meaning. Instead of a geminate, a homorganic nasal followed by the consonant is found in words in which the final consonant is preceded by a nasal vowel.

Gemination of word-final stop

Yet another context in which such vowel addition is compulsory is the addition of the suffix -y ‘also’ or the emphatic suffix -c after a word. When one of these suffixes is added to a word, the word stress shifts from the initial syllable to the final syllable ending with one of these suffixes. If the word to which one of these suffixes is added ends in a vowel, no further vowel addition is necessary before the suffix, but if the word ends in a consonant then the predictable vowel must be added to it before adding the suffix. For example, nātū  ‘grandson’, nātūc ‘the grandson himself’, nātūy  ‘also the grandson’; nāt  ‘granddaughter’, nātīc ‘the granddaughter herself’, nātīy  ‘also the granddaughter’. The consonant of the emphatic suffix is often geminated, in which case, another predictable vowel gets added after the suffix. For example, nātūc~ nātūcci  ‘the grandson himself’, nātīc ~ nātīcci ‘the granddaughter herself’.

Final vowel preservation in an accented syllable in the Sashti Christian dialect

What might look like vowel addition in the Sashti Christian dialect before the suffix -y ‘also and the emphatic suffix -c, (corresponding to Karnataka Christian -tsa) and also at the end of a sentence with a yes-no question intonation, however, is not a case of vowel addition.

The vowels involved here are i, u and o. If a word ends in a palatalised consonant, the vowel that appears after it is predictably  i. Elsewhere, the vowel u or o might appear. These vowels, however, are not phonetically predictable. What is here is a case of retention or preservation of vowels which have been lost in all other environments. There is historical and comparative evidence from Old Konkani and the Canara Saraswat dialect (which preserves the word-final short vowels of Old Konkani) that these vowels are original as can be seen in the table below.

In the Sashti Christian dialect, however, these vowels were lost except in an accented syllable. The phonetic environment that favours the retention of the vowels in this dialect appears to be accent; stress accent where a stressed suffix is added and pitch accent where there is yes-no question intonation. Since the vowel  ĭ palatalised the preceding consonant before it disappeared, it appears predictably after a palatalised consonant. Note that in Sashti Christian, there is no vowel a since it has merged with o.

Devoicing of stops

Voiced stops are replaced by voiceless ones before voiceless consonants; e.g.

See also
Canara Konkani
Konkani script
Konkani language
Konkani Language Agitation

Footnotes

Citations

Konkani
Indo-Aryan phonologies